Phaeomolis obscurata is a moth of the family Erebidae first described by Arthur Gardiner Butler in 1877. It is found in Brazil.

References

Phaegopterina
Moths described in 1877